Ethmia ballistis is a moth in the family Depressariidae. It is found in Kenya and Tanzania.

References

Moths described in 1908
ballistis
Moths of Africa